Maghar al-Mir (also known as al-Mughr or Mughr al Mir) is a Syrian village in the Qatana District of the Rif Dimashq Governorate. According to the Syria Central Bureau of Statistics (CBS), Maghar al-Mir had a population of 588 in the 2004 census. Its inhabitants are predominantly Druze. It was founded in the 1930s by settlers from the villages of Ayn al-Burj and Hinah. Maghar al-Mir had an Olympian come out of their country named Zid Abou Hamed.

See also
 Druze in Syria

References

Druze communities in Syria
Populated places in Qatana District